Ireland AM is an Irish morning television show on Virgin Media One. It airs live every weekday from 07:00 to 10:00, and weekends from 9:00 to 12:00. The program features news, current affairs, weather updates, showbiz, fashion, beauty, food, health, home and garden. Its current weekday presenters are Alan Hughes, Muireann O'Connell and Tommy Bowe.

The show is currently sponsored by Fairy, Febreze, Lenor, Ariel and Flash while the programme was previously sponsored by P&G, Unilever, Dolmio and Kellogg's.

As of 2021, Ireland AM is the only Irish breakfast programme currently airing.

As part of a new daytime schedule line up, from Monday 7 October 2019 the programme was extended to 11:00 am on weekdays, with the weekend editions now rebranded as Ireland AM too. In March 2020 it reverted to airing till 10:00 am on weekdays. During the COVID-19 pandemic, Ireland AM began airing at the later time of 8 am but reverted to its original time of 7 am in September 2020.

History

1999–2003
Ireland AM was launched on 20 September 1999 on the 1st anniversary of TV3's launch, the first show of its kind in Ireland. It was originally on air from 7:00 am to 9:00 am, hosted by Mark Cagney and Amanda Byram. The show went on air almost a year after TV3 launched, and was seen as an attempt by the station to improve ratings. In 2001 Amanda Byram left the show and moved to Channel 4 breakfast show The Big Breakfast.  Amanda was replaced by Claire Byrne. A number of years after the start of the show TV3 executives decided on an extra hour for the show, and the show finished at 10:30 am.

2004–2008
In March 2004, Claire Byrne left the show in order to replace Gráinne Seoige as the main news anchor on TV3. Byrne was replaced by Maura Derrane, a news presenter on the channel. In October 2005, Mark Cagney was nominated and later won the TV Personality of the Year Award at the Irish Film and Television Awards (IFTAs). After two years as co-host, Maura Derrane left the show in September 2006. She was replaced by television newcomer Sinead Desmond.

By 2009 Desmond, and original presenter Cagney, were joined by Alan Hughes, Aidan Cooney and Anna Daly, who also frequently present segments and interview guests. Elaine Crowley presents news bulletins every half-hour, while Laura Woods is also a frequent contributor. Today FM's Adelle McDonnell has contributed to a section of the show featuring soaps.

In 2008, Midday joined TV3's line up of Daytime programmes.

2009–2013
In 2009 it was joined by The Morning Show with Sybil & Martin which followed the show at 10:30, it remained as a sister show until 2013, when Late Lunch Live joined TV3's daytime line up.

Ireland AM won the "Favourite TV Show in Ireland" at the TV Now Awards in 2009.

The show won the award for Broadcaster/Journalist of the Year at the 2011 GALAs.

In 2013 a revamp of TV3 daytime schedule saw Ireland AM add 40 minutes. It aired from 7 am to 10:45 am.  From 07:00 to 08:00 Anton Savage presented a news and current affairs edition of the show, which is then followed by Ireland AM proper from 08:00 to 10:45. The revamp was due to falling daytime viewing figures from the channel.

Ireland AM currently makes up 12.5% of TV3 output, or 41% of their legally required Irish programming content.  The Best of Ireland AM airs at different times on Saturday and Sunday mornings on sister channel 3e, featuring highlights from the weekday shows. Ireland AM received an overhaul in September 2014. The show moved into the Sony HD Studios in Dublin's Ballymount.

2014–2018 
In July 2015, Ciara Doherty joined the show replacing Anna Daly who left the show to take up her new role on Saturday AM and Sunday AM which began from 29 August 2015.

On 31 July 2015 Ireland AM revamped its titles and on-air graphics.

On 19 November 2017, Sinead Desmond quit her role on Ireland AM over an alleged gender pay gap row with the station. Nearly six months after Desmond's departure, it was announced that Ciara Doherty would take over Desmond's role as co-host. In 2017 ITV's This Morning was moved from Virgin Media Three (then known as UTV Ireland) as a follow up to Ireland AM.

On Saturday 29 August 2015, Ireland AM launched spin-off shows Saturday AM and Sunday AM. Both shows are hosted by Anna Daly providing a mix of current affairs, showbiz, entertainment, in-studio guests, cookery, debate and fashion. Anna hosts the show each Saturday with Simon Delaney and on Sunday, formerly with Ivan Yates and latterly with Ian Noctor. Saturday AM focuses more on light entertainment whereas Sunday AM concentrates more on current affairs, debate and an analysis of Sunday newspapers. TV3 News provides news updates.

On 30 August 2018, to coincide with the rebranding of TV3 to "Virgin Media One", a relaunch of the show took place. A new studio and a new on screen look was revealed. On 1 September 2018, to coincide with the rebranding of TV3 to "Virgin Media One", the Saturday and Sunday editions of the programme were renamed as "Weekend AM".

In December 2018, it was announced that Aidan Cooney had left the show after being absent for several weeks.

2019–present 
In July 2019, Virgin Media Television announced that Mark Cagney, who had been presenting the show since it began on TV3 in 1999 would be leaving the show. Virgin Media Television are yet to reveal his permanent replacement.

On 31 July 2019 Cagney presented his last Ireland AM alongside Karen Koster and Alan Hughes. The show dedicated the last half hour of the show to him and aired a highlights reel. All the production crew, including Ciara Doherty who was on Maternity Leave at the time came in to wish Cagney good luck on his future endeavours.

In October 2019, Weekend AM was renamed Ireland AM.

On Monday 4 October 2019, Ireland AM was given an extra hour running from 7.00am – 11.00am, replacing ITV's This Morning, as part of a brand new weekday schedule launched by Virgin Media One, it was followed by Elaine.

On Monday 9 March 2020 ITV's This Morning returned to Virgin Media one with Ireland AM finishing at 10:00am and Elaine moving to 15:00.

In 2021 series regulars Aidan Power, Laura Woods and Anna Daly all left the show, while Karen Koster moved to The 6 O'Clock Show with Muireann O'Connell moving to Ireland AM. Elaine Crowley joined Simon Delaney after her show was axed.

In 2022, Brian Dowling joined Simon Delaney and Elaine Crowley on Saturday’s and Sunday's. Ireland AM also revamped it's titles and on air graphics.

Presenters
Ireland AMs current main presenters are Alan Hughes, Muireann O'Connell and Tommy Bowe – (Monday – Thursday) with Elaine Crowley, Martin King and Kaja Mia (Friday-Sunday)

Regulars
Regular contributors include journalists from the Irish Examiner, The Irish Times and TheJournal.ie.

Former presenters

Newsreaders
 Siobhan Bastible
 Geraldine Lynagh
 Michael Ryan
 Anne O'Donnell
 Niamh Kinsella
 Aisling Roche

Logos

References

1999 Irish television series debuts
2000s Irish television series
2010s Irish television series
Irish television talk shows
Virgin Media Television (Ireland) original programming